Shimotsuke Shinbun　（下野新聞） is a newspaper based in Utsunomiya, Tochigi Prefecture, Japan.  According to its website it was established in 1878 and has a circulation of over 270,000.

Further reading

External links
 Website

Newspapers published in Japan
Mass media in Utsunomiya